"Treat You Better" is a song by Canadian singer-songwriter Shawn Mendes, released through Island Records on June 3, 2016, as the lead single from his second studio album, Illuminate (2016). It was co-written by Mendes with Teddy Geiger, and Scott Harris, while Geiger produced the song alongside Dan Romer, and Daylight. The music video was released on July 12, 2016, and features a storyline about an abusive relationship.

"Treat You Better" peaked at number six on the US Billboard Hot 100, becoming his second top ten on the chart. Elsewhere, the song has topped charts in Poland, Slovakia and Slovenia, and peaked within the top ten of the record charts in Canada, the United Kingdom and other 18 countries.

Composition
The song is written in the key of B minor. and has a tempo of 83 beats per minute.

Awards and nominations

Critical reception
Billboard ranked "Treat You Better" at number 42 on their "100 Best Pop Songs of 2016" list. The New York Timess Jon Caramanica named it the eighth best song of the year.

Music video
The music video was released on July 12, 2016. It features a plot revolving around a situation of violence between couples. The video shows a girl being abused by her boyfriend in various situations, while Mendes hopes to be with her and struggles to understand why she prefers to be in that relationship. The video ends displaying the number for the National Domestic Violence Hotline. The music video also stars Devon Aoki's half sister Ellie Stuart Hunter  played with a guitar, drums and tambourines.

The video has received over 2.0 billion YouTube views as of late December 2020, and is one of the site's 60 most-watched videos.

Chart performance 
The song debuted at number thirty four on the US Billboard Hot 100 and later peaked at number six, making it Mendes' second top 10 single. It also reached the top 10 on the Mainstream Top 40 and Adult Top 40 national airplay charts. In Canada, the song has peaked at number seven on the Canadian Hot 100, passing "Life of the Party" as his highest-peaking single in his home country. The song has additionally achieved a top 5 position on the national CHR and Hot AC airplay charts, and has been certified gold by Music Canada. "Treat You Better" has also reached the top 10 in multiple markets including Australia, Germany, and Sweden.

Track listing

Live performances
Mendes' first televised performance of "Treat You Better" happened at the 2016 Much Music Video Awards on June 19. On July 12, 2016, he performed the song on The Tonight Show, and again on October 8, 2018, with Jimmy Fallon and his house band The Roots as backing using "classroom instruments". On November 20, 2016, Mendes performed "Treat You Better" at the 2016 American Music Awards.

Advertising use
"Treat You Better" is being used in a series of commercials for Southwest Airlines.

In July 2017, Swedish melodic metal band Sonic Syndicate released a cover version of the song.

Charts

Weekly charts

Year-end charts

Certifications

Release history

References

2016 songs
2016 singles
Shawn Mendes songs
Island Records singles
Republic Records singles
Universal Music Group singles
Number-one singles in Poland
Songs written by Scott Harris (songwriter)
Songs written by Shawn Mendes
Songs written by Teddy Geiger
Songs about domestic violence
Songs about jealousy